The 2015 Ağrı Challenger was a professional tennis tournament played on hard courts. It was the first edition of the tournament which was part of the 2015 ATP Challenger Tour. It took place in Ağrı, Turkey between 28 September and 4 October 2015.

Singles main-draw entrants

Seeds

 1 Rankings are as of September 21, 2015.

Other entrants
The following players received wildcards into the singles main draw:
  Anıl Yüksel
  Barış Ergüden
  Divij Sharan
  Muhammet Haylaz

The following players received entry from the qualifying draw:
  Altuğ Çelikbilek
  Fedor Chervyakov
  Lukas Mugevicius
  Sarp Ağabigün

The following player received entry as a protected ranking into the singles main draw:
  Ante Pavic

The following players received entry as a lucky loser into the singles main draw:
  Yahor Yatsyk

The following player received entry as a special exempt into the singles main draw:
  Petru-Alexandru Luncanu

Withdrawals
The following players were accepted directly into the main tournament but withdrew.
  Malek Jaziri (right ankle)→ replaced by  Yahor Yatsyk

Champions

Singles

 Farrukh Dustov def.  Saketh Myneni, 6–4, 6–4

Doubles

 Konstantin Kravchuk /  Denys Molchanov def.  Alexandr Igoshin /  Yaraslav Shyla, 6–3, 7–6(7–4)

External links
ITF Tournament Register

Ağrı Challenger
Ağrı Challenger
2015 in Turkish tennis